Joshua Memorial Park and Mortuary is a cemetery and mortuary in Lancaster, California. It is a popular location for the burials of notable local figures of the Antelope Valley.

Notable interments
 Paul Baxley (1923–2011) – Actor
 Raymond Hatton (1887–1971) – Actor
 George Hummel (1887–1965) – Businessman
 John B. McKay (1922–1975) – Astronaut
 Bruce Peterson (1933–2006) – Test Pilot, basis for "The Six Million Dollar Man"
 John Quade (1938–2009) – Actor
 Milton Orville Thompson (1926–1993) – Test pilot
 Joseph A. Walker (1921–1966) – Test pilot and astronaut
 Clarence White (1944–1973) – Bluegrass musician

References

External links
 
 

Cemeteries in Los Angeles County, California
Lancaster, California